Kiko the Kangaroo is a fictional kangaroo appearing in theatrical cartoons produced by Terrytoons. He is featured in ten cartoons made between 1936 and 1937.

Fictional biography
As with various anthropomorphic animals at the time, Kiko wears shorts and shoes. While he does not speak, the marsupial is skilled in hand-to-hand fighting, and would use his prowess to defend his troubled friends or subdue an opponent in a boxing match. He can also use his tail for various purposes.

Kiko was created by Terrytoons in a desperate attempt to rival characters of other studios. He first appeared in Farmer Al Falfa's Prize Package as a pet sent to the farmer by the latter's brother. Since then, the kangaroo would spend the rest of his short theatrical run in a series of his own. But after only ten cartoons were released, plans were made to create another cartoon featuring him, only to be not approved by Paul Terry.

Kiko is also among the few characters of the studio to have a theme song. He also has merchandise including plush toys.

Filmography
Below is a list of films in their original titles. Some of them later came with alternate names when distributed by other companies like Castle Films.

References

External links
Kiko the Kangaroo at the Big Cartoon Database
Kiko the Kangaroo at Don Markstein's Toonopedia.  from the original on November 17, 2015.

Film characters introduced in 1936
Fictional kangaroos and wallabies
Fictional mute characters
Terrytoons characters
Male characters in animation